Sutton Four Oaks is one of the 40 electoral wards in Birmingham, England.

Sutton Four Oaks is one of the four wards that make up the Parliamentary Constituency and council constituency of Sutton Coldfield. The ward lies to the north of Sutton Coldfield town centre and covers Hill Hook, Hill Wood, Roughley, Doe Bank, Ley Hill, Four Oaks, Four Oaks Park and Mere Green. Mere Green is the main shopping area for the ward and also has the ward's only library.

Population
According to the 2001 Population Census there were 21,690 people living in 9,274 households in Sutton Four Oaks. 4.9% (1,068) of the ward's population consisted of ethnic minorities compared to 29.6% for Birmingham in general. The population had increased to 24,205 at the 2011 Census.

Politics
Sutton Four Oaks is represented by Cllr Maureen Cornish on Birmingham City Council, and Cllrs Clare Horrocks and Simon Ward on Royal Sutton Coldfield Town Council.

Maureen, Clare and Simon all represent the Conservative Party.

References

External links 
Birmingham City Council: Sutton Four Oaks Ward

Sutton Coldfield
Wards of Birmingham, West Midlands